Chloé Jacquet (born 17 April 2002) is a French rugby union player. She plays rugby union for her home town Lyon in France where she also attends university.

Jacquet was named in the  France squad for the Rugby sevens at the 2020 Summer Olympics. She was named in France's fifteens team for the 2021 Rugby World Cup in New Zealand.

References 

  
2002 births
Living people
French female rugby union players
French rugby sevens players
Olympic rugby sevens players of France
Rugby sevens players at the 2020 Summer Olympics
Medalists at the 2020 Summer Olympics
Olympic silver medalists for France
Olympic medalists in rugby sevens
France international women's rugby sevens players
Sportspeople from Ain